Brzozów  is a village in the administrative district of Gmina Suchożebry, within Siedlce County, Masovian Voivodeship, in east-central Poland. Until 1945 some people were of German origin.

References

Villages in Siedlce County